is a former Japanese football player.

Playing career
Nakazato was born in Saitama Prefecture on August 31, 1973. After graduating from high school, he joined his local club Urawa Reds in 1992. On October 3, 1992, he debuted in 1992 J.League Cup against Nagoya Grampus Eight. However he could not play at all in the game after the debut. He retired end of 1994 season.

Club statistics

References

External links

reds.uijin.com

1973 births
Living people
Association football people from Saitama Prefecture
Japanese footballers
J1 League players
Urawa Red Diamonds players
Association football midfielders